Kanchiyar is a village located in Idukki taluk of Idukki district Kerala, India. The place has a vast cardamon and pepper plantations. Anchuruli, one of the famous tourist spots in idukki is located in Kanchiyar panchayath. The main settlements in Kanchiyar are Kozhimala, Swaraj, Labbakkada, Thoppipala, Mattappally and Kakkattukada.

Administration
Kanchiyar panchayath, which was recently raised to village level is divided into 16 wards for administrative convenience. The Kanchiyar village office is at Lebbakkada.

Wards

Demographics 
There are almost 400 families of different cast and religion.  census data, Kanchiyar village has population of about 21,023 in which 10,404 are women and 10,619 are men. The village has a literacy of about 92%. Kanchiyar village was bifurcated from Ayyappancoil village after Idukki taluk formation. Earlier, it was part of the Ayyappancoil village.

Religion 
Majority of people are Hindus and Christians. They maintain healthy relations and mutual co-operation. The Clarist Convent started its career in 1957 in the land donated by Shri Mathai Kalappurackal. The L.S.T. Convent began its missionary work on 7 January 1996. The Snehashram for destitute, under the guardianship of Rev. Fr. Francis OFM is at Nariyampara, the board of this parish.

Important pilgrim centers
 St.Mary's church, Kanchiyar-Pallikavala
 Holy cross church, Nariyampara
India Pentecostal Church of God, Kanchiyar
Assemblies of God in India, Kanchiyar
The Pentecostal Mission, Kanchiyar
 Holy family church, Kalthotty
 Lourde Matha church, Meppara
 Subramaniya Swami temple, Pezhumkandom
 Puthiyakavu Devi temple, Nariyampara
 Ayyappa-Mahavishnu-Devi temple, Nariyampara
 Sree Mahavishnu temple, Meppara
 Sree Dharmasastha temple, Thoppippala
 Sree Krishna Swami temple, Mattappally
 Muthiyamma Uma Maheshwara temple, Kanchiyar

Culture 
Kanchiyar panchayath is inhabited by the tribal community Mannan. The Mannan community has unique culture and rituals. They have a kingdom at Kozhimala (Kovilmala) near Swaraj with an elected tribal king. This community is the only tribal community in Kerala that has a king, and one of the only two such tribes in India. The current king here is Raman Raja Mannan who was elected in March 2012. He was elected after the death of the previous king, Aryan Raja Mannan.

Education 
The Following are the Institution on which we feel proud of St. Mary's L.P. and U.P. Schools which were started in 1959and 1977 respectively, the Clarist Convent, Mar Mathew Kavukattu Memorial Nursery run by the Clarist Convent, Marian Nursery School run by the Parish, J.P.M. Junior and B. Ed College which was started in 2005 by the C.S.T. fathers.

Educational institutions 
 Lourde Matha L.P. School, Lebbakkada
 Govt. L.P. School, Kanchiyar
 St.Mary's L.P School, Kanchiyar
 St.Mary's U.P school, Kanchiyar
 Mannam Memorial High School, Nariyampara
 Government Tribal H.S.S, Murikkattukudi
 Zion Public School, Swaraj
 S.N English Medium School, Thoppipala
 J.P.M College of Arts and Science, Lebbakkada

Transportation 
Kanchiyar is well connected with both state highways and local rural roads. Kattappana-Kuttikkanam state highway passes through Kanchiyar. Plenty of private busses and state-owned busses operates here.

References

Villages in Idukki district